"Get None" is the debut single by American R&B singer Tamar Braxton (then credited mononymously as Tamar). It is the opening track on her eponymous debut studio album and was issued as the album's first single. The song features raps from American hip hop musicians Jermaine Dupri and Amil and uncredited background vocals performed by Mýa. Mýa originally recorded her own version for her album Fear of Flying, but it didn't make it onto the album. It peaked at #59 on the Billboard R&B chart in 1999.

Music video
The official music video for the song was directed by Darren Grant and premiered on October 18, 1999.

Track listings and formats

Chart performance

References

External links
 
 

1999 songs
1999 debut singles
Tamar Braxton songs
Jermaine Dupri songs
Amil songs
DreamWorks Records singles
Music videos directed by Darren Grant
Song recordings produced by Jermaine Dupri
Songs written by Bryan-Michael Cox
Songs written by Jermaine Dupri
Songs written by Mýa
Songs written by Tamara Savage